"Last Song" is a single released by Gackt on November 12, 2003 under Nippon Crown. It peaked at fifth place on the Oricon weekly chart and charted for 13 weeks. It was certified gold by RIAJ. An unplugged piano-only version was recorded, and music video filmed, for The Seventh Night: Unplugged.

Track listing

References

2003 singles
Gackt songs